The Golden Goblet Award for Best Actress (Chinese: 金爵奖最佳女演员) is a prize given to actresses in the main category of competition at the Shanghai International Film Festival.

Award Winners

References

Lists of films by award
Shanghai International Film Festival
Film awards for lead actress